Gerry Quigley (3 November 1928 – 23 December 2003) was a trade unionist and political activist in Northern Ireland.

Quigley grew up in the Donegall Pass area of Belfast.  He studied at St Joseph's Training College before working as a primary school teacher.

Quigley was appointed Northern Secretary of the Irish National Teachers' Organisation (INTO) in 1954.  In this role, he secured equal pay for women teachers and pay equivalence between Northern Irish teachers and those in England and Wales.

In 1964, Quigley worked with National Unity, an Irish nationalist political study group, to call a conference of all nationalists in Northern Ireland.  This founded the National Political Front, and in 1965, Quigley became the first Chair of its successor, the National Party, soon renamed the National Democratic Party.

In 1978, Quigley became the General Secretary of INTO.  He also served as the President of the Irish Congress of Trade Unions.

References

1928 births
2003 deaths
Trade unionists from Belfast
Leaders of political parties in Northern Ireland
National Democratic Party (Northern Ireland) politicians
Presidents of the Irish Congress of Trade Unions
Schoolteachers from Belfast